Vegreville Airport  is a registered aerodrome located adjacent to Vegreville, Alberta, Canada.

References

External links
Information about this airport on The Town of Vegreville's Website.
Place to Fly on COPA's Places to Fly airport directory

Registered aerodromes in Alberta
County of Minburn No. 27